The Old Municipal Building and Masonic Hall in Shelby, Mississippi is a historic building built in 1935 that was designated a Mississippi Landmark in 2000.

A two-story brick commercial-type building, originally constructed as a meeting hall for Shelby Lodge No. 478 (a local Masonic Lodge which no longer exists), it now houses the Shelby Police Department.

References

Former Masonic buildings in Mississippi
Buildings and structures in Bolivar County, Mississippi
Mississippi Landmarks